Ignatios Glabas was the metropolitan bishop of Thessalonica between 1336 and 1341. He was also a contemporary of Nikephoros Gregoras.

References

Sources
 

14th-century Byzantine bishops
Ignatios
Byzantine bishops of Thessalonica